Evelyn "Eve" Whittle (born August 5, 1967) is an American actress and child psychologist best known for her TV role of the earnest and enthusiastic airport supervisor/technician Brenda Blue on the PBS Kids live action/CGI animated cartoon series Jay Jay the Jet Plane.  Brenda is noted for her formulaic enunciation of words.

Biography
Whittle is a program director for Kids on Stage, a Los Angeles-based theatrical program for children— it is her blue jumpsuit-clad character on Jay Jay that has made her a household name with pre-schoolers (and their parents). She is known for her crisp manner of speaking to the talking airplanes, and this makes Whittle—who uses her married name, Evelyn Whittle Keller, when not acting—an intriguing counterpoint to the childlike talking planes.

Eve is known for her ability to whistle in strange and haunting ways. In Jay Jay's Mysteries, Eve uses her own whistling as a special effect.

Eve Whittle is a graduate of Roanoke College (BA) and Antioch University (MA).  She lives in Culver City, California.

See also
Jay Jay the Jet Plane

External links

American television actresses
American stage actresses
Living people
Roanoke College alumni
Antioch University alumni
Child psychologists
Place of birth missing (living people)
1967 births
21st-century American women